Sokorodougou is a village in northwestern Ivory Coast. It is in the sub-prefecture of Bako, Odienné Department, Kabadougou Region, Denguélé District.

Sokorodougou was a commune until March 2012, when it became one of 1126 communes nationwide that were abolished.

Notes

Former communes of Ivory Coast
Populated places in Denguélé District
Populated places in Kabadougou